Nawan is a town and union council of Dera Ghazi Khan District in the Punjab province of Pakistan.
It has an area of 796,095 km2.  The currency is the Pakistani rupees.

References

Populated places in Dera Ghazi Khan District
Union councils of Dera Ghazi Khan District
Cities and towns in Punjab, Pakistan